'''Agyei' is a surname common in the African nation of Ghana, especially among the Akan. Notable people with the surname include:

 Dan Agyei (born 1997), English professional footballer
 Daniel Agyei (born 1989), Ghanaian footballer
 Daniel Kofi Agyei (born 1992), Ghanaian footballer
 William Kwabena Antwi Agyei (or Will Antwi) (born 1982), Ghanaian-English footballer
 Nicholas Anane-Agyei, Ghanaian politician

See also
 Adjei

References